Pulau Betong is a state constituency in Penang, Malaysia, that has been represented in the Penang State Legislative Assembly since 2004. It covers a part of the western half of Penang Island that includes the town of Balik Pulau.

The state constituency was first contested in 2004 and is mandated to return a single Assemblyman to the Penang State Legislative Assembly under the first-past-the-post voting system. , the State Assemblyman for Pulau Betong is Mohd Tuah Ismail from Parti Keadilan Rakyat (PKR), which is part of the state's ruling coalition, Pakatan Harapan (PH).

Definition

Polling districts 
According to the federal gazette issued on 30 March 2018, the Pulau Betong constituency is divided into 7 polling districts.

It encompasses a significant portion of the southwestern coast of Penang Island, covering Balik Pulau, the seat of the Southwest Penang Island District, and its surrounding villages.

The constituency is named after the eponymous Betong Island (under the Pulau Betong polling district), an islet off the southwestern coast of Penang Island.

Demographics

History

Election results 
The electoral results for the Pulau Betong state constituency in 2008, 2013 and 2018 are as follows.

See also 
 Constituencies of Penang

References 

Penang state constituencies